The Northampton Militia was a militia regiment in the United Kingdom from 1763 to 1860, when it was amalgamated into the Northampton and Rutland Militia.

The regiment was formed in 1763. It was embodied in 1778, at which time it was ranked the 36th regiment of militia, and remained active for around a decade. In 1780, it was stationed in London during the Gordon Riots. It was regularly re-ranked through its embodiment, becoming the 18th in 1779, 33rd in 1780, 44th in 1781, and 37th in 1782.

It was embodied again in 1793 for the French Revolutionary Wars, ranked as the 45th, and disembodied in 1802. With the resumption of hostilities in 1803, it was embodied again (as the 29th), and disembodied with the peace in 1814.

In 1833, it was ranked as the 48th. It saw its final service during the Crimean War, when it was embodied and volunteered for garrison service in the Mediterranean.

In 1860, it amalgamated with the Rutland Militia to form the Northampton and Rutland Militia, which would later become the Special Reserve battalion of The Northamptonshire Regiment.

References
Northampton Militia, regiments.org

Bibliography

Infantry regiments of the British Army
Military units and formations established in 1763
Military units and formations disestablished in 1860
Military units and formations in Northamptonshire
Northamptonshire